Hervé Roullet (born 7 September 1947) is a composer and French Catholic writer.

Biography
Roullet was born in Boulogne-Billancourt, near Paris, on 7 September 1947. He is an engineer from the École supérieure d'agriculture d'Angers  and he graduated from IAE Paris (also known as Sorbonne Graduate Business School).

He spent his professional career in the Parisian headquarters of various banking groups. He is also a composer of piano music and liturgical chants and Christian writer.

Musical works 

Roullet was taught by Henry Mesmin, a disciple of Vincent d'Indy and Déodat de Séverac. He is of the romantic tradition, with modern characteristics.

The writer and music critic Jean Cabourg defined him as a "musical watercolor artist haunted by grace " and added "a music which smells good, to quote Claude Debussy". His music, which is intimate and melodious, expresses a personal and original language. He pays homage to the beauty of creation, and appears to aim for an ideal which will give peace of mind and change of scenery.
 
 Piano pieces

The Pieces for piano are in two volumes : the Croquis champêtres et the Voyages oniriques.

Patrick Tudoret, the 2009 Grand prix de la Critique littéraire laureate, establishes a relationship between Jean Cras's works and those of Hervé Roullet: "[…] the complicity of a dreamed time between Jean Cras and the contemporary sensibility of Hervé Roullet impose upon the sober and haughty touch of Jean Dubé (musician). Deux impromptus and Ames d'enfants with Xavier Bouchaud, of the first one, find singular correspondences in the Croquis champêtres and the Voyages oniriques of the second"

 Liturgical pieces

The liturgical works are chants for mixed chorus, a cappella, or with piano or organ accompaniment. All the parts form a triptych: chants for the Mass (liturgy), Marian chants and other liturgical chants.
The used texts find their source in the Bible, the Roman Catholic liturgy, the Fathers of the Church or saints.

Among liturgical chants: Ave Verum Corpus, Tantum ergo, Our Father, Anima Christi, Divine Praises, ...

Among chants of Marian devotion: Ave Maria, Ave Maris Stella, Salve Regina, Ave Regina caelorum, Regina caeli,...

Literary works 

Roullet followed theological studies during 1995-2003, in Paris. He received a Master of theology from the Institut Catholique de Paris, specialization in ecumenism, on October 17, 2003.

He is the author of twenty-two books in french related to Christianity. Seventeen have received the Imprimatur of the Archbishop of Paris:
 Les chrétiennes martyres, depuis le début du christianisme, Paris, Hervé Roullet, AVM Diffusion, 2023.
 L'apparition de la Vierge Marie à La Salette. Marie réconciliatrice. Les vies de Mélanie Calvat et Maximin Giraud. Actualité des secrets, Paris, Hervé Roullet, AVM Diffusion, 2021.
 Joseph of Cupertino. Illetré, thaumaturge et théologien. Le saint qui s'envole devant le pape, Paris, Hervé Roullet, AVM Diffusion, 2020.
 Gemma Galgani, Paris, Hervé Roullet, AVM Diffusion, 2019.
 Lazare et ses soeurs Marthe et Marie, Lazarus of Bethany and his sisters Martha and Mary Magdalene, Paris, Hervé Roullet, AVM Diffusion, 2019.
 Les esprits célestes, the celestial Spirits, Paris, Hervé Roullet, AVM Diffusion, 2019.
 Les Martyrs d'Otrante, The Martyrs of Otranto, Paris, Hervé Roullet, AVM Diffusion, 2018.
 Sainte Mâtie, Paris, Hervé Roullet, AVM Diffusion, 2018.
 Les sept demeures de Marie (The seven houses of Mary): Nazareth, Jérusalem, Éphèse (House of the Virgin Mary), Lorette (Loreto, Marche)..., Paris, Hervé Roullet, AVM Diffusion, 2018. 
 Teresa Margaret of the Sacred Heart, Sainte Thérèse-Marguerite Redi, Une spiritualité du Coeur de Jésus, Coll. « Saints du monde », Éd. Pierre Téqui, Paris, 2017.
 Josephine Bakhita, l'esclave devenue sainte, Paris : Ed. de l'Emmanuel, 2015, Emmanuel Community.
 L'Amour. Le secret des chrétiens, Ed. Salvator, Paris, 2012. 
 L'amour et le mal, Ed. L'Œuvre, Paris,2012.
 1200 mots chrétiens, Éd. Sarment-Jubilé, Paris, 2010. 
 La foi catholique avec des mots simples, Éd. Docteur angélique, Avignon, 2010. 
 Être laïc et se former dans l'Eglise d'aujourd'hui, Ed. D.F.R, Bordeaux, 2010.
 Il est ressuscité, La foi catholique expliquée à tous, Ed. Soceval-Artège, Perpignan, 2009. 
 Marie Reine de l'Amour, Éd. Docteur angélique, Avignon, 2009.
 Saint Etienne (Saint Stephen), premier diacre et premier martyr, Coll. « Saints du monde », Éd. Pierre Téqui, Paris, 2006. 
 La renaissance du catéchuménat dans la France contemporaine et à "l'âge d'or" des Pères de l'Église (Church Fathers), Éd. Pierre Téqui, Paris, 2006.

Discography 
Piano :
 Scènes marines et champêtres, with some pieces of Jean Cras, Performers : Jean Dubé (musician) et Xavier Bouchaud for the four hands, CD Syrius 2010 réf. SYR 141430.
 Croquis champêtres et voyages oniriques, Jean Martin, piano, CD Syrius 2010 réf. SYR 141433.
 Pieces for piano (Feuilles d'album and The Crown othe Holy Virgin), Marie-Laure Boulanger, piano, CD Hervé Roullet 2019 réf. AVM ROU012.

Chants for mixed chorus :
Liturgical works were performed for the first time in the Saint-Louis-en-l'Île church of Paris in 2012-2013, by  the vocal Ensemble  Via Lucis  accompanied on the organ by Jean Galard. Those chants were recorded on two CDs :
 Oeuvres liturgiques, Vol 1, UPC-A: 3760151853791, 2013
 Chants liturgiques pour 4 voix mixtes, Vol 2, UPC-A: 3760151853852, 2013
Edith Weber, Professor Emeritus at the Sorbonne, UFR of Music and Musicology, wrote in the magazine  L'éducation musicale : "These two records show that according to the perspectives opened by the Second Vatican Council (1962-1965), liturgical songs in French are in full swing".

Two other CDs were recorded in 2020, also performed by the vocal Ensemble Via lucis, in the church of the Holy Family of Le Pré-Saint-Gervais, near Paris:
 Spiritual concert: Apocalypse and liturgical song. The CD contains in particular a musical account with all the texts of the Book of Revelation read during the annual liturgical cycle of the Catholic Church. UPC-A: 3760151854729
  Spiritual concert: Songs to the Virgin Mary . The CD contains especially a musical story on the Lourdes apparitions.UPC-A: 3760151854736

References

External links 
 http://imslp.org/wiki/Category:Roullet,_Herve dans International Music Score Library Project
 Official website
 The Christian formation trilingual website created and managed by Hervé Roullet

1947 births
Living people
Writers from Paris
French Roman Catholic writers
French male non-fiction writers
Christian hymnwriters
French composers
French male composers
20th-century French musicians
French hymnwriters
20th-century classical musicians
French religious writers
20th-century French male musicians